Fanny Sadowski (1826 –1906) was an Italian stage actress.

She managed her own theatre company from 1854, was the first female director from 1857, and the first female Impresario from 1870 in the Compagnia Reale at the Teatro dei Fiorentini in Naples.

References 

1826 births
1906 deaths
19th-century Italian actresses
Impresarios
Italian theatre directors
19th-century theatre managers